Date with an Angel is a 1987 American romantic fantasy comedy film starring Emmanuelle Béart, Phoebe Cates and Michael E. Knight. The film was written and directed by Tom McLoughlin. The original music score was composed by Randy Kerber. The visual effects were produced at Boss Film Studios under the supervision of Visual Effects Supervisor Richard Edlund. The film was marketed with the tagline "Jim is about to marry a princess... but he's in love with an angel."

Plot synopsis
Jim Sanders, an executive at a cosmetics company, is about to marry Patty Winston, the spoiled daughter of Jim's employer. Jim unknowingly has a brain tumor, and his headaches have gotten worse. It is suggested that he will die, and an angel arrives on the scene, given the task of bringing Jim's soul back to heaven on the night of his engagement party.

After his three buddies, George, Don and Rex, kidnap Jim to take him to another celebration at his home, Jim decides that he has had enough of partying and goes to sleep. Jim later awakes to see a bright light illuminating from his apartment's swimming pool—and discovers an angel knocked unconscious after one of her wings was broken due to colliding with an orbiting satellite. Not wanting to see her be exploited and unable to get the local priest to listen (he thinks Jim is about to do something lewd when he attempts to disrobe the Angel to reveal her wings), Jim decides to keep her shielded from the world while he helps repair her wings. This proves difficult, as the Angel is unable to speak in human language (though she has no trouble understanding it), and is unaccustomed to the limitations/requirements of life as a mortal. However, she does develop a taste for fries.

Inevitably, his buddies and his boss both discover her in his house; so does Patty, who—not seeing the Angel's wings—thinks that she is a mortal woman having an affair with Jim. Patty later sees the Angel and Jim together on television—wings still under wraps—as he rescues her from being exposed to the world by his buddies, who had kidnapped her.

They later escape to Jim's former childhood hideaway. In a short time, the Angel's wing is fully healed, allowing her to take flight and return to the pearly gates. However, drunk and delusional, Patty starts chasing Jim with a shotgun; her father, Jim's father, stepmother, and his buddies also arrive to confront him. Amid the chaos, Jim's uncontrollable headaches cause him to collapse to the ground, but the Angel returns to save him, using harmless but frighteningly-placed lightning bolts to drive away Patty and her father, never to return.

Later, in the hospital, Jim's brain tumor gets worse and his situation appears grim. The Angel comes back to see him, finally confirming that it was her original intention to take him to heaven. Instead, she saves him, and in the process is allowed to return to earth as a mortal woman, now able to speak English. She is now a nurse at the hospital. She kisses Jim after assuring him that he will be around and that they will be together for a long time, humorously stating that she has that information "from the highest authority".

Cast
 Michael E. Knight as James 'Jim' Sanders
 Phoebe Cates as Patricia 'Patty' Winston
 Emmanuelle Béart as Angel
 David Dukes as Edward Winston
 Phillip Brock as George
 Albert Macklin as Don
 Peter Kowanko as Rex
 Vinny Argiro as Ben Sanders
 Bibi Besch as Grace Sanders
 Cheryl Pollak as Rhonda/Cashier in Market
 Steven Banks as Aldridge
 Charles Lane as Father O'Shea
 J. Don Ferguson as Harlan Rafferty

Reception 
Date with an Angel currently holds an 11% rating on Rotten Tomatoes, from 9 reviews.

On their show, Gene Siskel and Roger Ebert specifically gave the film two emphatic thumbs down, with Ebert complaining that they had picked, along with Teen Wolf Too, the two worst films possible to be released on the same day.

See also
 List of films about angels

References

External links 
 
 
 
 

1987 films
1980s fantasy comedy films
1987 independent films
1987 romantic comedy films
1980s romantic fantasy films
American fantasy comedy films
American independent films
American romantic comedy films
American romantic fantasy films
1980s English-language films
Fictional angels
Films about angels
Films about businesspeople
Films directed by Tom McLoughlin
Films produced by Martha De Laurentiis
Films shot in North Carolina
De Laurentiis Entertainment Group films
Films with screenplays by Tom McLoughlin
1980s American films